Codec may mean:
 An audio codec converts between analog and digital representations or performs data compression.
 Codec, a hardware device or computer software used for coding and decoding transformations of data or signal media streams
 Codec, a fictional radio device used in the Metal Gear games
 A video codec is a device or software that enables video compression and/or decompression for digital video.

See also
 Kodak